Baumann House, also known as the Martz House, is a historic property located on Four Mile Road in Camp Springs, Kentucky, a rural area of Campbell County, Kentucky. The house was built in c.1852 as part of a settlement of German immigrants. The structure was added to the United States National Register of Historic Places in 1983.

It is a two-story three-bay stone house, built c.1852.

References

National Register of Historic Places in Campbell County, Kentucky
Houses in Campbell County, Kentucky
Houses on the National Register of Historic Places in Kentucky
German-American culture in Kentucky
1852 establishments in Kentucky
Houses completed in 1852